Derna Stadium is a multi-use stadium in Derna, Libya.  It is currently used mostly for football matches and is the home ground of Darnes & Afriqi.  The stadium holds 7,000 people.

References 

Football venues in Libya